The mtepe is a boat associated with the Swahili people (the word "boat" in the Bantu Swahili language being mtepe). The mtepe's planks are held together by wooden pegs and coir, so it is a sewn boat designed to be flexible in contrast to the rigid vessels of western technique.

Extinction

The cessation of the production of mtepe has been ascribed to the arrival of the Portuguese in the Indian Ocean in the 15th century, leading to boat builders adopting alternative, western shipbuilding techniques.

Preservation
Nearly a dozen photographs and nine known model mtepe have been preserved. Three models are kept at the Fort Jesus Museum, a Portuguese fort built in 1591 located on Mombasa Island, Kenya. One model is kept at the National Maritime Museum, Greenwich, London. One model is kept at the Science Museum, Kensington, London.

See also
Lashed-lug boat
Treenailed boat
Sewn boat
Swahili culture

External links

Indigenous Boats: The Mtepes of Kenya, with images

Further reading
 James Hornell, 1941. "The Sea-Going Mtepe and Dau of the Lamu Archipelago" In: Mariner's Mirror, January 1941.
 A.H.J. Prins, 1959."Uncertainties in Coastal Cultural History: The Ngalawa and the Mtepe.” In: Tanganyika Notes and Records No.55: pp.204-214.  
 A.H.J. Prins, 1982. “The Mtepe of Lamu, Mombasa and the Zanzibar Sea.” Pp. 85-100. In: From Zinj to Zanzibar: Studies in History, Trade and Society on the Eastern Coast of Africa.(In Honour of James Kirkman). Eds. J. de V. Allen and Thomas H. Wilson. Paideuma: Mitteilungen zur Kulturkunde Vol.28. Wiesbaden: Franz Steiner Verlag. 
 A.H.J. Prins, 1986. "Second Case Study: the Mtepe of the Swahili Coast." Pp.64-92. In: Ibid. ,Handbook of Sewn Boats: The Ethnography and Archaeology of Archaic Plank-Built Craft. Maritime Monographs and Reports No.59. Greenwich, London: The National Maritime Museum.  
Arabia to China  the Oriental Traditions, Jeremy Green, in The Earliest Ships: The Evolution of Boats Into Ships (Conway's History of the Ship), Naval Institute Press, 1996.

References

Citations

Notes

Boat types